The Church of St. Joseph in Greenwich Village is a Roman Catholic parish church located at 365 Avenue of the Americas (Sixth Avenue) at the corner of Washington Place in the Greenwich Village neighborhood of Manhattan, New York City. Constructed in 1833–1834, it is the oldest church in New York City specifically built to be a Roman Catholic sanctuary.

History 
St. Joseph's Parish was founded by Bishop John Dubois in 1829. At the time St. Joseph's Parish began, the population of New York, numbering 203,000, was concentrated in the southern half of Manhattan. Early church records indicate that St. Joseph's first congregants were predominantly Irish-Americans. The parish boundaries stretched from Canal Street to 20th Street, and from Broadway to the Hudson River. As additional parishes were created, St. Joseph's boundaries were trimmed, spanning from Houston Street to 14th Street, and from University Place to Hudson Street.

St. Joseph's was the sixth parish to be established in Manhattan, among those still in existence in the Archdiocese of New York. The five parishes that preceded it were St. Peter's on Barclay Street (1785), St. Patrick's Old Cathedral on Mulberry Street (1809), St. Mary's on Grand Street (1826), St. James on Oliver Street (1827) and Transfiguration on Mott Street (1827).

After several years in a rented hall at Grove and Christopher Streets, the cornerstone of the present church was laid on June 10, 1833. The church was designed by John Doran in the Greek Revival style, but it has been extensively renovated over the years. Two fires, one in 1855 and the other in 1885, caused extensive damage to the interior. Renovations after the second fire were supervised by Arthur Crooks. The interior of the church was restored in 1972. At the time, a fresco of the Transfiguration, after Raphael's original in the Vatican, was discovered under layers of paint and restored. Structural restoration work was performed in 1991–1992.

St. Joseph's School was established in 1855, with Sisters of Charity teaching the neighborhood girls and Christian Brothers teaching the boys. The first building was along Leroy Street, replaced in 1897 by a new building adjacent to the church.

The first public education program on AIDS ever held in Greenwich Village was held at St. Joseph's. The first meeting of Gay Men's Health Crisis also took place there. The event organized by parishioner David Pais was originally planned to be held in the school, but so many people attended that it had to be moved to the church.

When then-pastor Aldo Tos retired in 2003, the Archdiocese of New York asked the Dominican Order's Province of Saint Joseph, which was already staffing the nearby Catholic Center at New York University, to assume the responsibility of staffing priests for the parish. The result was a merger of the parish with NYU's Catholic Center in December 2003.

Tos was removed from ministry following accusations of sexual abuse of a minor, which were determined to be credible by the Archdiocese of New York. His laicization process was pending at his death in 2014.

The church today

The Catholic Center provides a wide spectrum of activities, programs, lectures and outreach programs. It is the center of five New York University (NYU) student clubs and for five groups of students and non-students. In addition to its campus ministry and other missions, the parish organized a weekly soup kitchen in 1982 (starting less formally in 1976) that operated for more than 30 years and has continued as an independent charity since 2015.

Pastoral staff 
Pastor: Boniface Endorf, O.P.
Priests: John Baptist Hoang, O.P., Pier Giorgio Dengler, O.P.
Previous pastors:
 James Cuddy, O.P.
 John P. McGuire, O.P. (1943–2016)
 Aldo J. Tos (1928–2014)
 John D. O'Leary (1928–2008)
 Robert Wilde (?–2004)
 John P. A. Sullivan (?–1971)
 Timothy F. Herlihy (1907–1970)
 John P. McCaffrey (?–1967)
 John J. Hickey (1869–1943)
 John Edwards (1833–1922)
 Denis Paul O'Flynn (1847–1906)
 John B. Salter (c.1847–?)
 Felix H. Farrelly (1832–1882)
 Thomas Farrell (1823–1880)
 Michael McCarron (1803–1867)
 Ambrose Manahan (1814–1867)
 John McCloskey (1810–1885), later Archbishop of New York and the first U.S. cardinal
 Charles Constantine Pise (1801–1866), previously Chaplain of the United States Senate
 James Cummiskey (?–1850)
 Patrick Duffy (?–1833), first pastor

References 
Explanatory notes

Citations

External links 

 "St. Joseph's Church in Greenwich Village", official website

Roman Catholic Archdiocese of New York
Joseph in Greenwich Village, Church of
19th-century Roman Catholic church buildings in the United States
Religious organizations established in 1829
Roman Catholic churches completed in 1833
Greenwich Village
1829 establishments in New York (state)